Helena Escholin (1713-1783) was a Finnish clergyman's wife and made wafers for the Turku Cathedral. Her records have been researched and are considered valuable in Finnish historical research.

References

1713 births
1783 deaths
18th-century Finnish people